Scott Gustafson is an American illustrator based in Chicago, Illinois, United States.  His career has spanned over twenty-five years, and during it, he has worked as a freelance cartoonist and contributed illustrations to various magazines and children's books. During the later years of his career, he wanted to write a story lengthier than a thirty-two page children's book. In August 2011, his only novel Eddie: The Lost Youth of Edgar Allan Poe was published.

His art style is inspired by the Golden Age of American Illustration.  Due to this, his work has a fairytale-like appearance and many of his illustrations feature fantastical and Biblical characters and settings.

Personal life

Gustafson was born and raised in Marengo, Illinois.  He enjoyed drawing as a child and his dream was to become an artist.  During high school, the works of Walt Disney and the Warner Brothers inspired him to pursue a career in animation.

He attended college at the Chicago Academy of Fine Arts.   While he was there, he focused on animation classes and only took one illustration class.  The school experienced internal troubles and had to close down.  This caused Gustafson to transfer to Columbia College Chicago.  He continued his pursuit of animation but started to consider a career in children's books when he took a children's book illustration class.

Gustafson is married and has a son.  He works at home with his wife, Patty.  She handles the computer and digital aspects of their business, while he works in his studio.  Due to this, he has stated that he is computer illiterate.

In an interview with “Insights from Illinois Authors,” Gustafson stated that he started out using gouache, acrylics, and watercolor for his works.  He mainly relied on acrylics, however, because they dried quickly, enabling him to meet deadlines.  When he began work on his first trade book, The Night Before Christmas by Clement Clarke Moore, he started to use oils due to having a more relaxed deadline.  Once he learned how to use oils more effectively and mix Liquin with them, they became his preferred medium to work in.

Career

Gustafson graduated from college with a degree in animation.  Despite this, Gustafson worked as a freelance artist after college instead because he learned that working in the field of animation was more restrictive than working in the field of illustration.  When asked about this career choice, Gustafson has stated, “The opportunities of animation, in terms of subject matter and creative control, weren’t nearly as interesting or rewarding as those of illustration.  As an animator, your contribution to a given film is, by necessity, limited to whatever character you’ve been assigned.  But as an illustrator, you’re responsible for locations, sets, costumes, props, lighting, and character designs, not mention the overall mood and emotion of a given painting.  It’s about the best job there is."

During his early years, he illustrated for small presses in the Chicago area and magazines.  Some time later, he received a call from New York and worked on a storybook version of Clement Clarke Moore's The Night Before Christmas a few months later.

In 1997, The Greenwich Workshop Collection released “treasures for the child in each of us.”  It is a collection of three-dimensional art created by Gustafson.

Gustafson has been commissioned by various publishers and companies such as Celestial Seasonings, Playboy magazine, Saturday Evening Post, The Bradford Exchange, and DreamWorks.

Books

Gustafson has stated that he has planned out stories on the side while he has worked on children's books, but those ideas never got approval from his editors.  He then realized that the stories he wanted to tell would not work as a short picture book.  He then got the idea for Eddie:  The Lost Youth of Edgar Allan Poe and decided to attempt to write a longer story.  The idea was approved, and in 2011, the book was released.

Gustafson stated that his goal when writing Animal Orchestra was not for it to just be entertaining for children but also educational. His goal with Eddie:  The Lost Youth of Edgar Allan Poe was to introduce young readers to the work of Edgar Allan Poe in hopes they would explore his writings.

Books by other authors that feature his work include:  The Night Before Christmas by Clement Clarke Moore, Peter Pan by J.M. Barrie, and The Nutcracker.

His own works are:  Alphabet Soup, Animal Orchestra, Classic Fairy Tales, Favorite Nursery Rhymes from Mother Goose, and Eddie:  The Lost Youth of Edgar Allan Poe.

Awards

Gustafson has won multiple awards over his career.  He has been awarded a Chelsea Award by the Association of Science Fiction and Fantasy Artists  and an Independent Publisher Book Award for Best Children's Picture Book.  He has also received a Chesly Award (2005) for Best Interior Artwork and a CA Illustration Award.

References

External links
 Official Website

American children's book illustrators
American speculative fiction artists
20th-century illustrators of fairy tales
21st-century illustrators of fairy tales
Fantasy artists
School of the Art Institute of Chicago alumni
Living people
Year of birth missing (living people)